Sporle with Palgrave is a civil parish in the English county of Norfolk.
For the purposes of local government, it falls within the district of Breckland.

The village
The village has a church, St Mary's, and is also served by a village shop and a pub called The Squirrel's Drey. There are active book clubs and a bus service.  There is a new primary school and a separate community centre in the former primary school.

St Mary's Church is a Grade I listed building. Edmund Nelson was curate and subsequently rector of Sporle; Susannah, the oldest sister of Horatio Nelson, 1st Viscount Nelson, was born here on 12 June 1755.

Notes 

Civil parishes in Norfolk
Breckland District